Deengli is a village in Rajgarh, Churu, Rajasthan, India. As per 2011 Census of India, the village has population of 2197 of which 1144 are males while 1053 are females.
It comes under ‘’’Sulkhnia chhotta’’’ Panchayath. It belongs to Bikaner Division . As per constitution of India and Panchyati Raaj Act, Deengli village is administrated by Sarpanch (Head of Village) who is elected representative of village. It is located 65 km towards East from District headquarters Churu. 230 km from State capital Jaipur. 
The most famous place in Deengli  is Net Dada JI temple.

Location 
Deengli is surrounded by Behal Tehsil towards East , Taranagar Tehsil towards west , Siwani Tehsil towards North , Pilani Tehsil towards South .
Taranagar , Rajgarh (Churu , Pilani , Churu are the nearby Cities to Deengli.

Population 
The Deengli village has population of 2197 of which 1144 are males while 1053 are females as per Population Census 2011. 
In Deengli village population of children with age 0-6 is 259 which makes up 11.79 % of total population of village. Average Sex Ratio of "Deengli" village is 920 which is lower than Rajasthan state average of 928. Child Sex Ratio for the "Deengli" as per census is 962, higher than Rajasthan average of 888.

Literacy rate 
‘‘‘Deengli’’’ village has higher literacy rate compared to Rajasthan. In 2011 literacy rate was encountered by CENSUS 89.2% in Comparison with Rajasthan in total 42.5% people are literate.

Caste factor 
Schedule Caste (SC) constitutes 24.44% while Schedule Tribe (ST) were 1.50% of total population in Deengli village.

Work profile 
In Deengli village out of total population, 1406 were engaged in work activities. 73.83% of workers describe their work as Main Work (Employment or Earning more than 6 Months) while 26.17% were involved in Marginal activity providing livelihood for less than 6 months. Of 1406 workers engaged in Main Work, 823 were cultivators (owner or co-owner) while 88 were Agricultural labourer.

References 

Villages in Churu district